Knighton may mean:

Places in England
 Knighton, Devon, a location
 Knighton, Isle of Wight
 Knighton, Leicester, Leicestershire, a suburb
 Knighton, Newcastle-under-Lyme, Staffordshire
 Knighton, Oxfordshire
 Knighton, Poole, a location
 Knighton, Somerset, a location
 Knighton, Stafford, Staffordshire
 Knighton, West Dorset, a location
 Knighton, Wiltshire
 Knighton, Worcestershire, hamlet in Inkberrow parish
 Knighton on Teme, Worcestershire, village and parish

Places in Wales
 Knighton, Powys a market town on the English/Welsh border 
Knighton railway station serving the town
Knighton Town F.C., its football club

People
Henry Knighton (d. 1396), English churchman and chronicler
Arthur Henry Knighton-Hammond (1875–1970), English artist
Brad Knighton (born 1985), American professional soccer player 
Brian Knighton (1971–2016), American professional wrestler better known as Axl Rotten
Conor Knighton (born 1981), American actor, host, and television producer
Dorothea Knighton (1780–1862), English artist
Erriyon Knighton (born 2004), American sprinter
Ken Knighton, English former footballer, coach and manager
Michael Knighton, English businessman
Richard Knighton (born 1969), senior Royal Air Force officer and engineer
Robert Wesley Knighton (1941–2003), American serial killer
Terrance O'Knighton (born 1986), American football coach and former defensive tackle
William Knighton (1776 – 1836), English nobleman, Private Secretary to the Sovereign under George IV
William C. Knighton (1864–1938), American architect
William Myles Knighton (born 1931), British civil servant
Zachary Knighton, American actor

Other uses
West Knighton (disambiguation), multiple uses
Knighton Woods, part of Epping Forest near Buckhurst Hill in Essex, England